Yorgancıoğlu cabinet was the government of Northern Cyprus between 2 September 2013 and 16 July 2015. It was formed after the 2013 parliamentary election, with the Republican Turkish Party (CTP) as the senior partner and the Democratic Party (DP) as the junior partner.

Composition 
The initial composition of the cabinet was as seen below:

Arabacıoğlu, the Minister of National Education, resigned on 23 September 2014, citing a lack of system, and according to Kıbrıs Postası, problems with transferring teachers to schools and students to colleges. On 8 October 2014, the Central Administrative Board of the DP convened and decided to remove Kaşif and Bakırcı from their posts as well. Özdemir Berova became the new Minister of National Education, Hasan Taçoy the new Minister of Transport and Public Works and Hakan Dinçyürek the new Minister of Environment and Natural Resources.

References 

Cabinets of Northern Cyprus